The 2006 Copa del Rey Final was the 104th final since its establishment. The match took place on 12 April 2006 at the Santiago Bernabéu Stadium in Madrid. The match was contested by Espanyol and Real Zaragoza, and it was refereed by Medina Cantalejo. Espanyol lifted the trophy for the fourth time in their history with a 4–1 victory.

Road to the final

Match details

References

External links
marca.com 
AS.com 

2006
1
RCD Espanyol matches
Real Zaragoza matches